Kirklees College is a further education college with two main centres in the towns of Dewsbury and Huddersfield in West Yorkshire, England.

History
The college was formed on 1 August 2008 after the Dewsbury College Dissolution order  approved that the corporation of Dewsbury College be dissolved and all its property, rights and liabilities transferred to Huddersfield Technical College. On 1 August 2008 Huddersfield Technical College changed its name to Kirklees College.

Former colleges
Part of Dewsbury College is the former Wheelwright Grammar School for Boys. It had around 450 boys in the 1960s and was administered by the County Borough of Dewsbury Education Committee.

The Batley School of Art moved to the Wheelwright Grammar School site on Birkdale Road, This campus was home to all of the art courses, but and also home to sports and fitness courses, due to the large playing field on its grounds. The centre operated an award-winning Photographic course – BA Hons Contemporary Photographic Arts, a full-time three year honours degree from the University of Huddersfield. The course had a national reputation and has approval from the 'British Institute of Professional Photographers', until it closed in 2018 

The main campus was on Halifax Road, Dewsbury, closed October 2020.

Sites

Dewsbury

The Dewsbury centre has two campuses in and around Dewsbury:

 Springfield Sixth Form College is on Bradford Road, opened 2018
Pioneer House Higher Skills Centre, opened November 2020
Former centres were previously known as Deswbury and Batley Technical and Art College (DABTAC)

Huddersfield

The main site is a new campus off Manchester Road, adjacent to the River Colne, just outside the Huddersfield town centre, at a cost of £74 million, in 2013 it replaced the New North Road Campus .

There are 4 additional satellite sites in Huddersfield:

Engineering and adjacent Process Manufacturing Centres, provides full and part time courses in engineering related fields including manufacturing, welding and motor vehicle.

The Brunel Construction Centre, located just off the A62, which offers courses in construction related fields including plumbing, bricklaying, plastering, electrical installation and plumbing.

The college's Taylor Hill Centre, on Close Hill Road in the Huddersfield suburb of Taylor Hill, provides full-time courses relating to animal care, land-based studies, conservation and countryside management.

Accreditation
The Leeds Metropolitan University  validated the School of Art and Designs' flagship course B.A.Hons "Fine Art for Design", an internationally renowned and award-winning course. Art, Design & Fashion. Since its creation in 1998 by Eve Jones and Richard Gray, students have gone on to study at The Royal College of Art, won the Unilever graduate of the year award and many other national and international prizes. The course exhibited in London every year at Free Range at the Old Truman Brewery on Brick lane.

Legal action
In November 2010 the college paid £5,000 compensation in a private settlement to a blind student, Tmara Senior, after legal action was taken against the school, for bullying by a teacher and other students in 2008. Tmara Senior and her husband Wayne, who is also blind said that they think it's important that what happened to Tmara shouldn't be “covered up” and “forgotten”.

Alumni

Batley School of Art
Tula Lotay, comic book artist
 Victoria O'Keefe (1969–1990), stage and film actor best known for playing nuclear war survivor Jane Beckett in made-for-TV film Threads (1984)
 Andi Watson, cartoonist

Huddersfield Technical College
 Sir David Brown, engineer and entrepreneur 
 Anthony Flinn, chef
 Justin Hawkins, musician
 Hervey Rhodes, Baron Rhodes, Labour MP from 1945–64 for Ashton-under-Lyne
 Marcel van Cleemput, toy designer
 Cousin Silas, musician
 Paul Scriven, Liberal Democrat peer

Dewsbury College
 Betty Boothroyd (Baroness Boothroyd), life peer (Crossbench) in the House of Lords 2001-2023, Speaker of the House of Commons 1992-2000, Labour Party MP from 1973–74 for West Bromwich and from 1974–2000 for West Bromwich West
 Walter Harrison, Labour MP from 1964–87 for Wakefield
 Keith Hellawell, Chief Constable from 1993–98 of West Yorkshire Police and from 1990–3 of Cleveland Police
Dean Hoyle, former owner of Card Factory and the ex-chairman and owner of Championship side Huddersfield Town
Mick Sullivan, rugby league player for Huddersfield, Wigan and St. Helens. Double world cup winner with Great Britain.

Wheelwright Grammar School for Boys
 Richard Alexander, Conservative MP from 1979–97 for Newark
 John Dunning, director from 1955–72 of the Rocket Propulsion Establishment at Westcott, Buckinghamshire
 Robin Esser, editor (1986–89) of the Sunday Express
 William George Fearnsides, Sorby Professor of Geology from 1913–45 at the University of Sheffield
 Philip Fothergill, English woollen manufacturer and Liberal Party politician
 Leslie Fox, mathematician
 Sir Marcus Fox, Conservative MP from 1970–97 for Shipley
 Larry Hirst, chairman since 2008 of IBN Europe, Middle East and Africa
 Tom Kilburn, worked with Frederic Calland Williams to produce the Manchester Mark 1 known as Baby in 1946, one of the first computers, and professor of computer science from 1964–81 at the University of Manchester
 Tony Nicholson, cricketer
 Donald Sadler, president from 1967–9 of the Royal Astronomical Society
 William Senior, Chief Dental Officer from 1947–61
 Percy Walker, aeronautical engineer who helped design the Hawker Hurricane, and later was largely responsible at the Royal Aircraft Establishment for discovering that metal fatigue caused the first de Havilland Comet airliners to crash
 Eddie Waring, rugby league commentator

See also
 University of Huddersfield – from 1896–1956 formerly known as Huddersfield Technical College, then Huddersfield College of Technology until 1970

References

External links 
 Kirklees College
 EduBase

Further education colleges in West Yorkshire
Education in Huddersfield
Buildings and structures in Huddersfield
Educational institutions established in 2008
Dewsbury
Education in Kirklees
2008 establishments in England